Jenni Sorkin (born August 29, 1977) is an American art historian, curator, and educator. She is best known for her writing in art criticism, and for highlighting work by feminist artists and artists working in fiber and associated crafts.

Biography 
Jenni Sorkin born in Chicago, Illinois on August 29, 1977. She received a PhD in Art History from Yale University in 2010. She also attended the School of the Art Institute of Chicago and Bard College.  

Sorkin is the author of the book Live Form: Women, Ceramics, and Community (2016), and her essays have appeared in exhibition catalogs for various artists. She is on the faculty of the department of art history at the University of California, Santa Barbara.

Sorkin was the co-curator (with Paul Schimmel) of Revolution in the Making: Abstract Sculpture by Women 1947–2016, the inaugural exhibition at Hauser Wirth & Schimmel in Los Angeles. The exhibition featured sculptures by 34 women artists.

In 2021, Sorkin published Art in California, which provides a chronology of art-making in a state at the intersection of migration and global politics, including the institutions and networks that have shaped the radical art movements of California.

See also 

 Women in the art history field

References

1977 births
Living people
American art curators
American women curators
American art historians
Women art historians
Yale University alumni
21st-century American women
Bard College alumni
School of the Art Institute of Chicago alumni